Herald Island is an island of approximately  in the upper reaches of Waitematā Harbour in Auckland, New Zealand.

Geography
Herald Island is located in an upper arm of Waitematā Harbour between Whenuapai (to the west) and Greenhithe (to the east). It is relatively flat and low-lying, though it rises slightly at the eastern end 

The island is connected to the mainland at its western end by the Kingsway Road causeway, which crosses  of marshy tidal zone.  The northern shore of the island is dominated by Christmas Beach, which runs almost the entire length of the island. A large mudflat lies along the southwestern edge of the island, extending towards the suburb of Hobsonville to the south. The eastern edge of the island is located along a safe channel, frequently used by small pleasure craft; the Herald Island Boating Club is situated here, at the island's easternmost point.

Two main roads, The Terrace and Ferry Parade, run parallel to the northern and southern shores of the island respectively. These are connected by several short streets which cross the island from northwest to southeast. An area of open parkland, Herald Island Domain, is located in the centre of the island, and a smaller park, Pākihi Reserve, is sited close to the boat club at the island's eastern end.

History

Pre-European history
In Māori, the island was given various names, including Motu Pākihi (Pākihi) and Te Pahi ō Te Poataniwha (or Te Pāhī). In the 18th Century, the island was a seasonal residence for Waiohua paramount chief Kiwi Tāmaki, when it was the season to snare birds. During the Ngāti Whātua/Te Taoū war with Waiohua, the twin Waiohua chiefs Hūpipi and Hūmātaitai from Ōrākei were killed at Herald Island by a Ngāti Whātua war party.

European history 

It was known as Wood's Island after its first European owner, from the 1840s until the late 1880s, and from the late 1880s until the early 1950s, as Pine Island. In 1953, the island joined the Waitakere Riding of the Waitemata County, having previously not had any form of local government. At this time, the island's name was officially changed to Herald Island. It was linked to the mainland by a causeway in 1957, for which Waitemata County Council charged residents a special rate of 5·878d.

There are 275 houses on the island, which has a walkway around its perimeter. The island is almost entirely residential, with no shops but some small home-based businesses.

Demographics

Herald Island had a population of 702 at the 2018 New Zealand census, a decrease of 18 people (−2.5%) since the 2013 census, and an increase of 6 people (0.9%) since the 2006 census. There were 255 households, comprising 357 males and 348 females, giving a sex ratio of 1.03 males per female, with 105 people (15.0%) aged under 15 years, 99 (14.1%) aged 15 to 29, 372 (53.0%) aged 30 to 64, and 123 (17.5%) aged 65 or older.

Ethnicities were 89.3% European/Pākehā, 9.0% Māori, 3.8% Pacific peoples, 5.1% Asian, and 2.1% other ethnicities. People may identify with more than one ethnicity.

Although some people chose not to answer the census's question about religious affiliation, 60.7% had no religion, 31.6% were Christian, 0.4% were Buddhist and 2.1% had other religions.

Of those at least 15 years old, 165 (27.6%) people had a bachelor's or higher degree, and 66 (11.1%) people had no formal qualifications. 159 people (26.6%) earned over $70,000 compared to 17.2% nationally. The employment status of those at least 15 was that 318 (53.3%) people were employed full-time, 96 (16.1%) were part-time, and 21 (3.5%) were unemployed.

The island is part of the larger Whenuapai statistical area.

References 

Islands of the Auckland Region
Populated places around the Waitematā Harbour
Suburbs of Auckland
West Auckland, New Zealand